Rudolf Horváth (born June 28, 1947) is a former Slovak handball player.

He played for Czechoslovakia and won the gold medal in the 1967 World Men's Handball Championship in Sweden.

References 

Slovak male handball players
Slovak people of Hungarian descent
1947 births
Living people